Jalan Bukit Beruntung, Federal Route 3208 (formerly Selangor state route B112), is an industrial federal road in Selangor, Malaysia.

The Kilometre Zero is located at Sungai Choh, at its interchange with the Federal Route 1, the main trunk road of the central of Peninsular Malaysia.

At most sections, the Federal Route 3208 was built under the JKR R5 road standard, allowing maximum speed limit of up to 90 km/h.

List of junctions

References

Malaysian Federal Roads